Miao Yihua (born 11 February 1988) is a Chinese pentathlete. She was born in Shanghai. She competed in modern pentathlon at the 2012 Summer Olympics in London.

References

1988 births
Living people
Sportspeople from Shanghai
Chinese female modern pentathletes
Olympic modern pentathletes of China
Modern pentathletes at the 2012 Summer Olympics
Asian Games medalists in modern pentathlon
Modern pentathletes at the 2010 Asian Games
World Modern Pentathlon Championships medalists
Asian Games gold medalists for China
Medalists at the 2010 Asian Games
20th-century Chinese women
21st-century Chinese women